Into the West is a 1992 Irish magical realist film about Irish Travellers written by Jim Sheridan and David Keating, directed by Mike Newell, and stars Gabriel Byrne and Ellen Barkin.

Into the West was one of several major films to come from Ireland during the 1990s, including the likes of My Left Foot, The Field, The Miracle, The Commitments, The Boxer, The Playboys, In the Name of the Father, War of the Buttons and The Crying Game.

Plot

Into the West is a film about two young boys, Tito (Conroy) and Ossie (Fitzgerald), whose father "Papa" Reilly (Byrne) was "King of Irish Travellers" until his wife, Mary, died during the birth of their second son, Ossie. The boys' grandfather (David Kelly) is an old story-telling Traveller, who regales the children with Irish folk-tales and legends. When he is followed by a beautiful white horse called Tír na nÓg (meaning "Land of Eternal Youth" in Irish), from the sea to Dublin, where the boys and their father have now settled down in a grim tower block in Ballymun, the boys are overwhelmed with joy and dreams of becoming cowboys. The horse is stolen from them by corrupt Gardai and is sold as a Racehorse. They see Tir Na Nog on TV, and they begin their adventure to get their mystical horse back. They escape the poverty of a north Dublin council estate, and ride "Into the West". Papa Rielly is arrested, and beaten by the corrupt Gardai, until he is released on the orders of the superintendent. He then returns to his halting site, where he is shown no welcome. His friend Kathleen, takes him in and from there they go to track the boys. Meanwhile the boys find shelter using traditional traveller methods and move further West as "Cowboys" as they travel, they find the Gardai, helicopters and dog packs tracking them. Tir Na Nog always seems to find a way to avoid them. The horse takes them to their mother's grave, Where Ossie finds out his mother died giving birth to him. The net closes in on the boys, forcing them to flee to the beach, where they find Papa Rielly, Kathleen and the Barrel maker. The Gardai catch Papa Rielly and the Barrel maker in nets, and Tir Na Nog gallops into the sea, with Ossie still on his back. Papa Rielly breaks free and goes into the sea, where he brings out a lifeless Ollie. After performing CPR, Ollie comes round. The superintendent calls off the hunt for the boys. After that, Papa Rielly finally burns his Barrel Wagon, and puts his Wife's memory to rest. The boys see Tir Na Nogs image in the flames, and smile.

Cast
 Gabriel Byrne as Papa Reilly
 Ellen Barkin as Kathleen
 Ciarán Fitzgerald as Ossie
 Rúaidhrí Conroy as Tito  (credited as Ruaidhrí Conroy)
 David Kelly as Grandfather
 Johnny Murphy as Tracker
 Colm Meaney as Barreller
 John Kavanagh as Hartnett
 Brendan Gleeson as Inspector Bolger
 Jim Norton as Superintendent O'Mara
 Anita Reeves as Mrs. Murphy
 Ray McBride as Mr. Murphy
 Dave Duffy as Morrissey
 Stuart Dannell-Foran as Conor Murphy (credited as Stuart Dannell)
 Becca Hollinshead as Birdy Murphy

Production
The script was written by Jim Sheridan, who did not intend to write simply for children, although the film mainly follows two young children on the run with their beautiful, magical white horse. Other themes targeted to adults, are also present: grief, the clash of cultures with differing values, and the use of the police by the rich and powerful to enforce property rights in their favour. Sheridan wrote the script five years before he directed My Left Foot.

Gabriel Byrne said it was one of the best scripts he ever read, and described it at the time as Jim Sheridan's best work to date. Byrne was committed to the work, he said; Apart from it being a story about Travellers, and the relationship between a father and his two sons, it really was in a way about Ireland. Ellen Barkin said that from the first reading she thought it an extraordinary piece of film writing.

The movie's most memorable scenes, such as the horse in the cinema and the beans exploding, were shot in the small town of Portarlington in County Laois.

Reception
The film has received a mostly positive critical reception. On Rotten Tomatoes, the film has a score of 77% based on reviews from 13 critics.

Roger Ebert of the Chicago Sun-Times said the "kids will probably love this movie, but adults will get a lot more out of it". Variety Staff said that "Into the West is a likable but modest pic", and that "a major asset throughout is Patrick Doyle's rich, Gaelic-flavoured scoring that carries the movie's emotional line and fairy tale atmosphere. Desson Howe of The Washington Post said that the film is "a charming children's crusade – a rewarding journey for all ages". Rita Kempley of the Washington Post said that "the movie is alternately grim and lyrical", and "though long on ambiance and short on story, it may appeal to the spiritually inclined – and to oater lovers.

Box office
The film was the fourth highest-grossing film in Ireland for the year with a gross of £748,080.

Awards
 1993: Roxanne T. Mueller Audience Choice Award for Best Film at the Cleveland International Film Festival – Mike Newell.
 1993: Starboy Award at the Oulu International Children's Film Festival – Mike Newell.
 1994: Golden Calf for Best European Film at the Netherlands Film Festival – Mike Newell.
 1994: Young Artist Award for Outstanding Family Foreign Film at the Young Artist Awards – Mike Newell.
 1994: Young Artist Award for Outstanding Youth Actor in a Family Film at the Young Artist Awards – Rúaidhrí Conroy & Ciarán Fitzgerald.

Home video releases
Into the West was released on VHS and LaserDisc format in the US by Touchstone Home Video in 1994. The DVD was released in the US on 4 February 2003 by Miramax Home Entertainment with an aspect ratio of 1.85:1 anamorphic widescreen.

The VHS was released in Ireland and the UK on 21 September 1993 by Entertainment in Video. It was released on DVD in Ireland and the UK on 17 December 2001 by Entertainment in Video and again on 15 September 2003 by Cinema Club. As of 2020, it is being broadcast on the Criterion Channel in the USA and Canada.

References

Bibliography 
 Lance Pettitt, Screening Ireland: film and television representation, Manchester University Press, 2000, 320 p. 
 Joe Cleary, Outrageous Fortune: Capital and Culture in Modern Ireland, vol. 1, Field Day Publications, coll. « Field day files », 2007, 320 p.

External links
 
 
 
 

1992 films
Ballymun
Irish fantasy films
1990s adventure films
Films about horses
Films directed by Mike Newell
Works about Irish Travellers
Films scored by Patrick Doyle
Films set in Ireland
Films based on Celtic mythology
Miramax films
English-language Irish films
1990s English-language films